Adolf Heeb (born 11 July 1940) is a former cyclist and politician from Liechtenstein. He competed in the individual road race at the 1960 Summer Olympics. He later served as a member of the Landtag of Liechtenstein and leader of the Patriotic Union party.

References

External links
 

1940 births
Living people
Liechtenstein male cyclists
Olympic cyclists of Liechtenstein
Cyclists at the 1960 Summer Olympics
Patriotic Union (Liechtenstein) politicians